Alaska is a 2015 drama film written and directed  by Claudio Cupellini and starring Elio Germano and Àstrid Bergès-Frisbey. It entered the competition at the Rome Film Festival.

Plot 
"Alaska" is the name of a disco that the young Fausto opens, after a violent life, just released from prison. He is in love with Nadine, a French girl who had a successful period in Milan as a model. However, now she is broke because Fausto used her savings to invest in the disco Alaska behind her back. Fausto opened the disco with Sandro, a man he met through Nadine, and business is good, but Nadine sees her relationship with Fausto destroyed because he took her savings, so she betrays him by sleeping with her boss. Fausto is outraged when he finds out and claims he wants nothing to do with Nadine. Later on, Fausto is dating Francesca, a woman who comes from a wealthy family. Through her father, Fausto gets the opportunity to run an elegant hotel. Sandro felt betrayed by Fausto and he loses all his money from betting and in despair kills himself. Fausto then tries to mend the relationship with Nadine,  though he should marry Francesca and run the wild hotel chain. Nadine runs away angry, and one day, during a quarrel with her new employer, she kills him, ending up in prison. Fausto apparently ditches Francesca entirely and now goes to visit Nadine every week, waiting for the end of the sentence.

Cast 
 Elio Germano as Fausto
 Àstrid Bergès-Frisbey as  Nadine
 Valerio Binasco as  Sandro
 Elena Radonicich as  Francesca
 Paolo Pierobon as  Marco
 Antoine Oppenheim as  Nicolas
 Pino Colizzi as  Alfredo Wiel
 Marco D'Amore as  Toni
 Roschdy Zem as  Benoit
  Anastasia Vinogradova  as Eva

Accolades

See also 
 List of Italian films of 2015

References

External links 

2015 films
2015 romantic drama films
Italian romantic drama films
French romantic drama films
Films set in Paris
Films set in Milan
Films about infidelity
Films directed by Claudio Cupellini
2010s French films